Africa Bibliography is an annual guide to works in African studies published by Cambridge University Press on behalf of the International African Institute (IAI). It was established in 1984 and is published as an annual print volume and simultaneously as a searchable online database. The online database consolidates the back volumes of the Africa Bibliography into a single database which can be queried using quick search, Boolean, and faceted search options. Items included are monographs, chapters in edited volumes, journal articles, and pamphlets. Languages included are English, Portuguese, French, Italian, German, Swahili, Spanish, and Afrikaans. Subject areas covered are the social and environmental sciences, humanities and the arts, alongside some items from medical, biological, and natural sciences. Every entry in the bibliography is categorised by region, country, and subject and newer entries are tagged with additional keywords. As an annual publication, it records the previous year's published work in its field, with provision for retrospective inclusion of earlier items.

The bibliography is currently compiled by Terry A. Barringer (University of Cambridge) and is prepared alongside the IAI's journal Africa.

During the 2014 meeting of the US African Studies Association Africa Bibliography received the Conover-Porter Award 2014 (best africana bibliography or reference work).

External links 
 
 Search interface

References 

African studies journals
Publications established in 1984
Annual journals
English-language journals
Cambridge University Press academic journals
Published bibliographies